Adolfo Fumagalli (19 October 18283 May 1856) was a 19th-century Italian virtuoso pianist and composer, known today primarily for his virtuosic compositions for the left hand alone.

Born in Inzago, Italy, he grew up in a very musically oriented environment. He had three brothers who also became musicians and composers, these being Carlo (1822-1907), Luca (1837 - 1908), Disma (1826 - 1893) and Polibio (1830 - 1901). Fumagalli studied music with Angeloni at the Milan Conservatory and, in 1848, at the age of 20, made his Milan debut with some success. He then travelled to Turin, Paris, Belgium and Denmark, playing his own operatic fantasies and other salon works to great acclaim.

In 1856 he returned to Italy and, when he arrived, was soon thereafter given an Erard grand piano from the firm as an advertising promotion. On 1 May that year he gave a concert but, shortly after, fell ill and died days later in Florence. 
 
He created his greatest sensation when he began performing his works for left hand. Although he looked rather frail, as is evident from paintings of him, he had a phenomenal technique and strong fingers that astonished everyone.

Fumagalli's output is quite extensive, though almost all of it is extremely difficult to obtain today. His works consist primarily of operatic fantasies and character pieces. One of his most difficult and virtuosic works is his Grande Fantasie sur Robert le Diable de Meyerbeer, op.106 (dedicated to Liszt) for the left hand. He also composed an arrangement of Vincenzo Bellini's "Casta Diva" from Norma for the left hand. Almost his entire output is for solo piano and the works which employ other instruments all seem to include the piano in some way, a feature that is similar to Chopin's output. Although he was perhaps not a very inspired or ingenious composer, his works for left hand alone stand nonetheless as an important testament of the progress in technique and virtuosity of the period, especially of single-handed works.

Musical works
List of works:
Op. 1 Fantaisie on motives from Verdi's opera Nabuccodonosor for piano  
Op. 2 Notturno-Studio for left hand
Op. 3 The Devil's Galop for piano
Op. 4a Reminiscences of Meyerbeer's opera Robert le Diable for piano 
Op. 6 Tarantelle for piano 
Op. 8 La fucina di Vulcano/ Il Canto dei Ciclopi : scherzo fantastique for piano
Op. 11 Caprice romantique for piano
Op. 12 Nocturne sentimentale in Ab Major for piano  
Op. 13 Il genio della danza : scherzo brillant for piano  
Op. 14 Grande fantaisie on motives from Bellini's La Sonnambula for piano
Op. 16 Pensée pathétique for piano
Op. 17 Nocturnino for piano
Op. 18 
No.1 Studio da Concerto based on Fra poco a me ricovero from Donizetti's opera Lucia di Lammermoor for left hand
No.2 Studio da Concerto based on Coro O Signore del tetto natio from Verdi's opera I Lombardi for left hand
Op. 20 Les trois soeurs : petites fantaisies for piano 
No.1 Based on Verdi's opera Attila
No.2 Based on Verdi's opera Foscari
No.3 Based on Verdi's opera Ernani
Op. 21 Les clochettes : grande concerto fantastique pour piano avec l'accompagnement d'un grand orchestra et une campanella 
Op. 23 Quatres airs de ballet variés from Verdi's opera Jérusalem for piano
No.1 Pas de Quatre
No.2 Pas de Deux
No.3 Pas Seul
No.4 Pas d'Ensemble 
Op. 26 Grande Fantaisie Drammatique on motives from Donizetti's opera Lucia di Lammermoor  for piano 
Op. 27 Grande Caprice de Concert for piano
Op. 28 Grande Fantasie on Bellini's opera I Puritani (Dedicated to his brother Polibio for piano 
Op. 29 Nenna : Tarantella Giocosa for piano
Op. 30 Grande Fantaisie on Bellini's opera Norma for piano 
Op. 31 Petit morceau de salon on Verdi's opera Macbeth for piano 
Op. 32 Petit morceau de salon on Verdi's opera La Battaglia di Legnano for piano
Op. 33 La pendule : caprice fantastique contenant un galop-carillon et un polka-mazurka for piano
Op. 34 Petite Fantaisie on Verdi's opera Lucrezia Borgia for piano
Op. 35 Petite Fantaisie on Donizetti's opera Elisir d'amore for piano
Op. 36 Beatrice di tenda : petit morceau de salon for piano
Op. 37 Souvenir de Nice : polka-caprice for piano
Op. 38 Nocturne: Une Nuit d'Été, passetemps sentimental for piano
Op. 39 Amorosa : mazurka sentimentale for piano 
Op. 40 La capricciosa : Tyrolienne for piano 
Op. 41 Morceau de salon : chanson espagnole from Rossi's opera Il domino nero for piano
Op. 42 Morceau de salon on Rossi's opera Il domino nero for piano
Op. 43 Le prophete : grande fantaisie de bravoure for piano
Op. 44 La serenade espagnole : morceau elegant for piano
Op. 45 Fantaisie on Bonoldi's opera Nera Orientale for piano
Op. 47 Le Postillon : galop de concert for piano
Op. 48 Le Ruisseau : etude impromptu for piano
Op. 49 Grande Marche cosaque on a national air for piano 
Op. 50 Serenade napolitaine for piano
Op. 51 Le Streghe : pièce fantastique for piano
Op. 52 Musical Recreations: two divertimenti for piano on motives from Verdi's opera Luisa Miller 
No.1 Premier Divertimento 
No.2 Deuxième Divertimento
Op. 53 Esprits Folles : saltarelle for piano
Op. 54 Fantaisie on Donizetti's opera Linda de Chamounix for piano
Op. 55 Stabat Mater by Rossini for piano
Op. 56 Fantaisie on Bellini's opera La Straniera for piano
Op. 57 Si loin! : Mélody by Paul Henrion variée for piano 
Op. 58 Luisa : polka de concert for piano 
Op. 59 Fantaisie on a melody from Verdi's opera Stiffelio
Op. 60 Grande Fantaisie Militaire for piano
No.1 Ronda Notturna for piano
No.2 Una notte al campo for piano
No.3 Signal d'alarme et conflit de guerre from Bellini's opera Norma for piano
No.4 Marcia funèbre for piano
No.5 Inno trionfale from Rossini's opera Le Siège de Corinthe for piano
No.6 Orgia for piano
Op. 60 Grande Fantaisie Militaire transcribed for four hands by the author 
Op. 61 Casta diva from Bellini's opera Norma for left hand 
Op. 62 La sacrilega parola : Variations on the Grande Adagio Finale from the 2nd act of Donizetti's opera Poliuto for piano
Op. 63 Souvenir de Chopin : mazurka for piano
Op. 64 La Derelitta : pensée romantique for piano
Op. 65 La festa dell'innocenza : cinque morceaux brillants for piano  
Op. 66 Fantasie brillante on motives from Donizetti's opera Poliuto for piano
Op. 68 Introduction et Grande Nocturne on Sanelli's opera Il Fornaretto for piano
Op. 69 La Baccante : caprice burlesque for piano
Op. 70 Sogno d'amore : pensée fugitive for piano
Op. 71 Morceau de Salon : caprice on Chiaromonte's opera Il Gondoliero for piano 
Op. 72 Fantaisie Brillante on Verdi's opera I Due Foscari for piano
Op. 73 Nocturne variée on the romanza Fior di bonta bell'angelo from Villanis's opera La Regina di Leone for piano
Op. 74 Fantaisie Brillante on Verdi's opera Ernani for piano 
Op. 75 I Lombardi alla prima Crociata : introduction et grande adagio variées sur la terzette "Qual volutta trascorrere" for piano
Op. 76 Laura : polonaise de concert for piano
Op. 77 Saluto al Tamigi : deuxième polka de concert, capriccio-impromptu for piano
Op. 78 Un lamento : deuxième mazurka sentimentale for piano
Op. 79 L' Absence : romance variée for piano
Op. 80 La Chasse : morceau brillant for piano
Op. 81 Grande Ouverture de Benvenuto Cellini par Hector Berlioz : transcrite pour piano 
Op. 82 Nocturne elegant for piano
Op. 83 La danse des sylphes, de Felix Godefroid : rondo brillant for piano
Op. 84 Grande Fantaisie on Bellini's opera I Puritani for two pianos  
Op. 85 Preghiera alla Madonna "O Santissima Vergine" : Popular Tuscan song by L. Gordigiani transcribed for piano 
Op. 86 L' Étincelle : reverie de F. Bonoldi variée pour piano
Op. 87 La buena ventura : chanson andalouse de Yradier variée for piano
Op. 88 La cloche : mélodie de F. Bonoldi variée pour piano
Op. 89 Introduction et adagio varié on the romanza "Sempre all'alba ed alla sera" from the opera Giovanna d'Arco for piano
Op. 90 Le Palmier : polka des magots for piano
Op. 91 Fantaisie on Verdi's Nabucodonosor for piano
Op. 92 Paraphrase on the barcarolle Una Barchetta in Mar from Donizetti's opera Gianni di Calais for piano  
Op. 94 Paraphrase on the Grande adagio finale from Coccia's opera La solitaria delle Asturie for piano
Op. 95 Un carnaval de plus, souvenir de Venice : Caprice de Concert for piano
Op. 95b Fantaisie on Verdi's opera Il Trovatore for piano
Op. 98 Fantaisie on Verdi's opera La Traviata for piano
Op. 100 École Moderne du Pianiste : recueil de 24 morceaux caracteristiques for piano
Op. 101 Tarantelle de bravoure on Thomas's opera La Tonelli for piano
Op. 102 Mi mancha la voce (Andante) from Rossini's opera Mosé in Egitto for left hand
Op. 103 Cantique de Noel for piano
Op. 104 Berceuse for piano  
Op. 105 L' Échange : ariette for piano
Op. 106 Grande Fantasie sur Robert le Diable de Meyerbeer (Dedicated to Franz Liszt) for left hand
Op. 107 posth. Mon Ange : mélodie d'Auguste Morel transcrit pour piano 
Op. 108 posth. Illustrations from Verdi's opera Giovanna de Guzman (I Vespri Siciliani) for piano 
Op. 108 Premier Boléro  
Op. 109 posth. Ariele : nocturne variée from Leoni's opera Suddetta for piano
Op. 110 Enfants, n'y touchez pas : romance for piano
Op. 111 Paraphrase on Buzzolla's barcarolle Tace il vento in ciel sereno for piano
Op. 112 posth. Duettino "Presso alla tomba" (the author's last work) for piano

Also included in his output are several songs for voice and piano.

References

External links
 
 Grande Fantaisie sur Robert le Diable,  for piano left hand, Op.106 played by Artur Cimirro on YouTube

1828 births
1856 deaths
19th-century classical composers
19th-century classical pianists
19th-century Italian male musicians
Italian Romantic composers
Italian classical composers
Italian male classical composers
Italian classical pianists
Italian male pianists
Male classical pianists
Classical pianists who played with one arm
Milan Conservatory alumni
People from the Province of Milan